Lapaeumides actor is a moth in the Castniidae family. It is found in Brazil.

References

Moths described in 1824
Castniidae